The Narrows is the strait that separates the Caribbean islands of Saint Kitts and Nevis. At its narrowest, it is 3 kilometres wide.

History 
Over the years it has been observed that fish stock and  biodiversity in general in The Narrows was deteriorating.
In 1986 the Island Resources Foundation developed a marine parks proposal for the Southeast Peninsula area of St. Kitts.
In 1998 the St. Kitts Fisheries Management Unit developed a proposal for the preparation of a Management Plan for the development of Marine Protected Areas.
In 2006 the Nevis Department of Fisheries  developed a proposal for management of the Narrows.
As of 2019 a new enhanced management proposal of The Narrows Marine Managed Area (NMMA) in St. Kitts and Nevis is being developed.

References

Bodies of water of Saint Kitts and Nevis
Straits of the Caribbean